The Sanjak  of Jerusalem was an Ottoman sanjak that formed part of the Damascus Eyalet for much of its existence. It was created in the 16th century by the Ottoman Empire after it took over Palestine following the 1516–1517 Ottoman–Mamluk War. It was detached from the Syrian eyalet and placed directly under the Ottoman central government in 1841, and created as an independent province in 1872 as the Mutasarrifate of Jerusalem. It ceased to exist in 1917 during the Great War as a result of British progress on the Middle Eastern front, when it became a British-administered occupied territory.

References

Bibliography

 
 
 
  

Land of Israel
Ottoman Palestine
Jerusalem